Miia Nuutila (born 12 October 1972) is a Finnish television actress.

Life
Nuutila was born in Forssa. In 2003, she appeared in Aarresaaren sankarit on Finnish television on MTV3.

Nuutila has appeared on a number of Finnish TV series.

Selected filmography 
 FC Venus (2005)
 Mystery of the Wolf (Suden arvoitus, 2006)
 Lapland Odyssey (Napapiirin sankarit, 2010)

References

External links

Living people
People from Forssa
Finnish television actresses
1972 births